Puthucode Rama Sundaram Iyer (also spelt Sundara Aiyar) (1862–1913) was an Indian lawyer who served as one of the first Indian judges of the Madras High Court. He founded the Madras Law Journal along with V. Krishnaswamy Iyer. He is the great grandfather of Indian cinematographer P. C. Sreeram.

Notes

References 

 

1862 births
1913 deaths
19th-century Indian lawyers
Judges of the Madras High Court
20th-century Indian judges
People from British India
20th-century Indian lawyers